For the 2015 Rugby World Cup qualifying, there were three inter-confederation play-offs to determine the final qualification spot to the 2015 Rugby World Cup. The process ended with the 20th and final team to qualify for the World Cup. Four teams, the best non-qualifier from each region except Oceania, competed for the last place at the Rugby World Cup finals in England. Uruguay won the final play, thus becoming the 20th qualifier for the World Cup and joined hosts England, Australia, Wales and Fiji in Pool A.

Format
The play-off was contested on a knockout basis, with one-game semi-finals and a two-legged home and away final. One semi-final featured the third place team from European qualification and the second place team from African qualification. The other saw the third placed team from the Americas qualification and the second place team from the Asia qualification.

The host of each semi-final was the team with the higher IRB Ranking at the moment it became known who the two teams were.

Teams

Matches

Preliminary round
The first match was contested between Russia and Zimbabwe, and the second match between Uruguay and Hong Kong. Upon completion of African qualifying on July 6, Russia outranked Zimbabwe 20th to 27th and thus earned the right to host. Likewise, upon completion of Asian qualifying on May 25, Uruguay outranked Hong Kong 20th to 23rd to earn the right to host.

Qualification round
The final stage of the Repechage qualification, and Rugby World Cup qualification, was a two-legged series between Russia and Uruguay. As Uruguay were the higher ranked team upon completion of the preliminary round, they traveled to Russia for the first leg and host the second. Uruguay won the series with an aggregate score of 57–49.

First leg

Second leg

References

External links
Rugby World Cup Repechage qualification

2015
repechage
2014 in Russian rugby union
2014 in Zimbabwean sport
2014 in Uruguayan sport
2014 in Hong Kong sport